The 2020 France Sevens was the thirteenth edition of the annual Sevens tournament held in France. It was the first time since 2019 (suspended due to the impact of COVID-19) that the tournament was held in France, and the first time that the event was held in the southern city of Toulouse, Haute-Garonne at the Stade Ernest-Wallon.

The tournament winners were Fiji, who won their fourth France Sevens event, and their second back-to-back tournaments. Fiji won the final against first-time Sevens Series finalists Ireland 29–17.

Following the event, Argentina, Ireland, Fiji and hosts France jumped up one place on the series ladder, while Samoa, who finished fourth, jumped from fifteenth to tenth. Teams Canada and Kenya dropped two places, and the United States, finishing with their second-worst result of the series, dropped three places to sit seventh overall.

Format
The sixteen teams were drawn into four pools of four. Each team played the three opponents in their pool once. The top two teams from each pool advanced to the Cup bracket, with the losers of the quarter-finals vying for a fifth-place finish. The remaining eight teams that finished third or fourth in their pool played off for 9th place, with the losers of the 9th-place quarter-finals competing for 13th place.

Teams 
The sixteen national teams competing in France were:

Pool stage

Pool A

Pool B

Pool C

Pool D

Knockout stage

13th–16th playoffs

9th–12th playoffs

5th–8th playoffs

Cup playoffs

Placings

See also
 2022 France Sevens (for women)

References

2022
2021–22 World Rugby Sevens Series
2022 rugby sevens competitions
May 2022 sports events in France
Sport in Toulouse